The Scotokaryotes (Cavalier-Smith) is a proposed basal Neokaryote clade as sister of the Diaphoretickes. Basal Scotokaryote groupings are the Metamonads, the Malawimonas and the Podiata. In this phylogeny the Discoba are sometimes seen as paraphyletic and basal Eukaryotes.

An alternative to the Unikont–Bikont division was suggested by Derelle et al. in 2015, where they proposed the acronyms Opimoda–Diphoda respectively, as substitutes to the older terms. The name Opimoda is formed from the letters (shown in capitals) of OPIsthokonta and aMOebozoa. In this phylogeny Discoba belongs to the Diphoda clade.

Taxonomy 
A proposed cladogram is

See also
Diphoda

References 

Eukaryote unranked clades